Dhaneshwor Temple is 1 km south of the town Banepa. This is a temple of Shiva.

References

External links
   KMC plan goes up in smoke

Hindu temples in Bagmati Province
Buildings and structures in Kavrepalanchok District